The year 1957 saw a number of significant events in radio broadcasting history.

Events
6 February – Establishment of the Faroese broadcasting corporation, Útvarp Føroya.
12 February – KPEG in Spokane, Washington, goes on air with an all-woman announcing team, who all use the first name Peg on air.
KNOC in Dallas, Texas becomes a full-time rhythm and blues station, the first such in the US broadcasting market.
WCOW in St. Paul, Minnesota becomes WISK.

Debuts
14 January – The Affairs of Dr. Gentry debuts on NBC.
8 April – The popular midday programme Autofahrer unterwegs begins its 42-year-long run on Österreich-Regional in Austria.
28 October – Today first broadcast as a daily early-morning topical radio show on the BBC Home Service; it will still be running 60 years later.
KBCS in Dallas, Texas signs on with a Top 40 format.
KBZY in Salem, Oregon signs on with a Top 40 format.

Closings
 27 February – The Crime Files of Flamond ends its run on network radio (Mutual). 
 30 July – Hilltop House ends its run on network radio (NBC). 
 22 September – CBS Radio Workshop ends its run on network radio (CBS). 
 27 December – Strike It Rich ends its run on network radio (NBC).

Births
 17 January – Steve Harvey, African American comedian, television host, radio personality, actor and author.
 16 March – Garry Cobb, American National Football League player, later radio personality on WIP in Philadelphia, Pennsylvania.
 18 May – Rob Bartlett, American comedian, actor and writer best known for Imus in the Morning.
 9 July – Paul Merton, né Martin, English comic performer and broadcast panel show participant.
 24 August – Stephen Fry, English actor and broadcast panel show participant.
 22 September – Ted Williams, American radio personality on WWCD (AM).
 24 November – Edward Stourton, English radio news presenter.
 7 December – Winifred Robinson, English radio presenter.
 Garry Richardson, English radio sports presenter.

Deaths
 2 May – Herb Butterfield, 61, American radio and television actor.

References 
 

 
Radio by year